Robert Edis Fairbairn (17 June 1879 - 30 May 1953) was a Canadian minister, writer, and pacifist.

Fairbairn became a committed pacifist after "firsthand exposure to the reactions of young men in bayonet drill", and within a decade of the First World War he emerged as "one of the most prolific pacifist writers in Canada". Later, Fairbairn helped R. B. Y. Scott and Gregory Vlastos to produce Towards the Christian Revolution (1936). In his chapter, he argued that one of the primary functions of the Christian faith was to generate opposition to war. In 1939, Fairbairn drafted a manifesto entitled Witness Against War, ultimately signed by over 150 United Churchmen.

Fairbairn was often critical of the church for its failure to oppose escalating violence throughout the world. By the end of his career, he had become "the most outspoken radical pacifist in Canada".

Regarding his contributions to Christian pacifism:

References

1879 births
1953 deaths
Canadian anti-capitalists
Canadian anti-war activists
Canadian Christian pacifists
Canadian Esperantists
Canadian Methodist ministers
English emigrants to Canada
Methodist pacifists
Non-interventionism